Adore: Christmas Songs of Worship is the second Christmas album from Chris Tomlin. sixstepsrecords alongside Sparrow Records released the album on October 23, 2015. He worked with Ed Cash, in the production of this album which was recorded at Ocean Way Nashville with a live singing audience.

Background
Adore: Christmas Songs of Worship is a 2015 Christmas album by contemporary Christian music artist Chris Tomlin scheduled for release on October 23.

The album features new, original songs and familiar favorites, along with guest performances by Crowder and Lauren Daigle.

An Adore Christmas Tour with artists Crowder and Lauren Daigle is planned for December.

In November the song was the No. 1 on the list of number-one Billboard Christian Albums.

Critical reception

Matt Conner, indicating in a four star review by CCM Magazine, says, "The good news is that Adore is an inspired album from beginning to end." Awarding the album three and a half stars from New Release Today, Jonathan J. Francesco states, "it's refreshing to hear some Christmas music that keeps the focus on the Birthday Boy and maintains artistic integrity doing it." Scott Fryberger, giving the album three stars for Jesus Freak Hideout, writes, "it has some shining moments, but it's not enough to warrant a purchase unless you're a diehard Tomlin fan." Rating the album four stars at The Christian Beat, Madeline Dittmer says, "Adore: Christmas Songs Of Worship...point[s] listeners to the true meaning of the holiday season." Tony Cummings, indicating in a seven out of ten review by Cross Rhythms, responds, "with such fine vocal performances and sympathetic arrangements I'm happy to ignore the occasional descent into cliché."

Commercial performance
The album debuted at No. 31 on Billboard 200, selling 13,000 copies in the first week. In its third week of release, the album sold 9,000 copies in the US; in its fifth week, the album sold 11,000 copies; in its sixth week, 30,000 copies were sold, peaking at No. 17 on Billboard 200. The album has sold 90,000 copies as of September 2016.

Track listing

Personnel 
 Chris Tomlin – lead vocals, acoustic guitar
 Ed Cash – keyboards, programming, acoustic guitar, electric guitar, bass, backing vocals
 Matt Gilder – keyboards, programming
 Matt Maher – programming (1)
 Ross Copperman – programming (8)
 Daniel Carson – acoustic guitar, electric guitar
 Matthew Melton – bass
 Byron House – bass
 Travis Nunn – drums 
 Jim Brock – percussion
 Claire Indie Nunn – cello
 Jim Hoke – harmonica (10), saxophone (10), horn arrangements (10)
 Steve Patrick – trumpet (10), piccolo trumpet (10)
 Lauren Daigle – lead vocals (4), guest vocals (13)
 Kristyn Getty – Scripture reading (7)
 Crowder – spoken word and guest vocals (8)
 All Sons & Daughters – guest vocals (9)
 Leslie Jordan – guest vocals (13)

Production
 Ed Cash – producer, engineer, mixing
 Louie Giglio – executive producer
 Shelley Giglio – executive producer, art direction 
 Brad O'Donnell – executive producer
 Ocean Way (Nashville, Tennessee) – recording location
 Joe Baldridge – engineer
 Josh Ditty – assistant engineer
 Vian Zaayman – editing
 Ted Jensen – mastering at Sterling Sound (New York City, New York)
 Mike McCloskey – art direction
 Leighton Ching – art direction, design 
 Kendra Harrell – design
 Cameron Powell – artist photography
 Eric Brown – live event photography

Charts

References

2015 Christmas albums
2015 live albums
Chris Tomlin albums
Christmas albums by American artists